Indaziflam is a preemergent herbicide especially for grass control in tree and bush crops.

History
In 1991, the Japanese company Idemitsu Kosan filed a patent to 2-amino 6-fluoroalkyl triazine derivatives as herbicides. One of these compounds was subsequently given the ISO common name triaziflam but had limited success as a commercial herbicide. Bayer scientists subsequently investigated this area of chemistry and identified indaziflam as having superior properties, which they patented and developed under the code number BCS-AA10717. The compound was first registered for use in the USA in 2010.

Mechanism of action
Indaziflam is an inhibitor of cellulose biosynthesis. This mechanism of action was theorized to be responsible for indaziflam's effect in 2009 and proven in 2014. The cellulose biosynthesis inhibitors (CBIs) are identified as Class 29 by the Weed Science Society of America/Herbicide Resistance Action Committee.

Resistance
 there are no resistant populations known and none for the broader CBI class (discounting quinclorac).

Brand names
Indaziflam composes all or part of the a.i. of several herbicides from Bayer Environmental Science, including the Esplanade line (sometimes mixed with diquat dibromide and glyphosate isopropylamine), Marengo, Specticle, and Bayer CropScience (the inventor of the ingredient), like Alion.

Uses
Indaziflam is approved in the United States for hops, Rubus spp., Coffea spp., bushberries, tropical crops, drupes/stone fruit, and tree nuts. It is used as a preemergent.

References

Herbicides
Triazines
Organofluorides
Amines